Saint Nicolas Church is a Gothic cathedral in Trnava, Slovakia. It was built between 1380 and 1421. The church is 60m long, 31 m wide, its sanctuary was 17,3m and the nave 18m high. The architecturally homogeneous Gothic basilica type temple, whose nave is nearby twice as high as the aisles, bears marks of the Danube style. The sanctuary of this massive brick structure faces east. Buttresses supporting the high walls alternate with Gothic windows decorated with original stone traceries. The largest Gothic window, adorned with rich traceries and stained glass, is at the church front.

Romanian-Hungarian humanist and scholar Nicolaus Olahus (Nicholas, the Vlach) and Croatian cardinal, diplomat and writer Antun Vrančić are buried in the church.

Buildings and structures in Trnava
Monuments and memorials in Slovakia
Cathedrals in Slovakia
Churches in Trnava Region
Gothic architecture in Slovakia